Saint-Mathieu (French for Saint Matthew) may refer to:

Places

France
 Saint-Mathieu, Haute-Vienne
 Saint-Mathieu-de-Tréviers, Hérault
 Pointe Saint-Mathieu, a headland in Brittany

Canada
 Saint-Mathieu, Quebec
 Saint-Mathieu-de-Beloeil, Quebec
 Saint-Mathieu-d'Harricana, Quebec
 Saint-Mathieu-du-Parc, Quebec

Buildings and structures
 Abbaye Saint-Mathieu de Fine-Terre, a former Breton monastery at Pointe Saint-Mathieu, Brittany
 Saint-Mathieu Lighthouse, at Pointe Saint-Mathieu, Brittany
 Saint-Mathieu-de-Beloeil Aerodrome, Quebec
 Saint-Mathieu-de-Laprairie Aerodrome, Quebec

Other
 Battle of Saint-Mathieu (10 August 1512), part of the War of the League of Cambrai

See also
 San Mateo (disambiguation)
 Sant Mateu (disambiguation)
 São Mateus (disambiguation)